The Pyramid of the Sun is the largest building in Teotihuacan, and one of the largest in Mesoamerica. It is believed to have been constructed about 200 AD. Found along the Avenue of the Dead, in between the Pyramid of the Moon and the Ciudadela, and in the shadow of the mountain Cerro Gordo, the pyramid is part of a large complex in the heart of the city.

History

The name Pyramid of the Sun comes from the Aztecs, who visited the city of Teotihuacan centuries after it was abandoned; the name given to the pyramid by the Teotihuacanos is unknown.  It was constructed in two phases.  The first construction stage, around 200 CE, brought the pyramid to nearly the size it is today. The second round of construction resulted in its completed size of 225 meters (738
feet) across and 75 meters (246 feet) high, making it the third-largest pyramid in the world, though still just over half the height of the Great Pyramid of Giza (146 metres). The second phase also saw the construction of an altar atop of the pyramid which has not survived into modern times.

Over the structure, the ancient Teotihuacanos finished their pyramid with lime plaster imported from surrounding areas, on which they painted brilliantly colored murals. While the pyramid has endured for centuries, the paint and plaster have not and are no longer visible. Jaguar heads and paws, stars, and snake rattles are among the few images associated with the pyramids.

It is thought that the pyramid venerated a deity within Teotihuacan society.  However, little evidence exists to support this hypothesis. The destruction of the temple on top of the pyramid, by both deliberate and natural forces prior to the archaeological study of the site, has so far prevented identification of the pyramid with any particular deity.

Structure measurements, location and orientation

The pyramid was built on a carefully selected spot, from where it was possible to align it both to the prominent Cerro Gordo to the north and, in perpendicular directions, to sunrises and sunsets on specific dates, recorded by a number of architectural orientations in Mesoamerica. The whole central part of the urban grid of Teotihuacan, including the Avenue of the Dead, reproduces the orientation of the Sun Pyramid, while the southern part exhibits a slightly different orientation, dictated by the Ciudadela.

Excavations underneath the Pyramid
In 1959, archaeologist Rene Millon and his team of researchers were some of the first groups of archaeologists to study the tunnel system underneath the Pyramid of the Sun. While some of these tunnels were made after the fall of Teotihuacan and the Aztecs, they eventually connected to tunnels and caves that were made during the periods of these civilizations. The investigations led by Millon revealed that most of the main tunnels were sealed off, and whether this was purposeful or not is up to interpretation. The tunnels underneath the pyramid gleaned pieces of pottery, hearths, and other meticulously-made artifacts from other cultures that showed evidence elsewhere in Teotihuacan. Millon and his team ultimately concluded from their research and excavation efforts that the pyramid was either built continuously over various periods of time by the people in Teotihuacan, or that the entire pyramid was built during one period of time with its foundation and cave system being made separately in an earlier period of time. The splitting of the time periods is due to different cultures having expressive influence in the artifacts found in the tunnels underneath the pyramid. Millon and his team believe that the early depictions of the pyramids in Teotihuacan being built by slaves is wrong due to the craftsmanship of the pyramid itself as well as the popularity of Teotihuacan amongst its peoples. The people who built these pyramids had the motivation to do so, whether they immigrated from elsewhere in Mesoamerica or not. 

In 1971, archaeologist Ernesto Taboada discovered an entrance to a seven meter-deep pit at the foot of the main staircase of the Pyramid of the Sun. The caves and tunnel systems underneath the pyramid were investigated by various archaeologists who have all concluded that these caves were sacred to those in Teotihuacan in the same way that caves were important cross-culturally in Mesoamerica. Various sources point to different theories of interpretations for why the Pyramid of the Sun was built and what the cave systems underneath it truly mean according to the Teotihuacan people and culture.   

The cave directly underneath the pyramid is located six metres down beneath the centre of the structure.  Originally this was believed to be a naturally formed lava tube and interpreted as possibly the place of Chicomoztoc, the place of human origin according to Nahua legends.  More recent excavations have suggested that the space is man-made and could have served as a royal tomb.  Recently scientists have used muon detectors to try to find other chambers within the interior of the pyramid, but substantial looting has prevented the discovery of a function for the chambers in Teotihuacan society.

“Since skeletal remains and charcoal are absent in the cave, owing to ancient vandalism, it is impossible to date the earliest use of the place for ritual purposes or for rites of passage. The ceramics and discs could have been placed here centuries after the conversion of the natural tunnel into a shrine. In view of the position of the pyramid over the grotto, it would seem that the cave was the focal point and not an accidental coincidence, and that it may have determined the site for the construction of a primitive place of worship and then for the pyramid.” .

As stated above by Heyden, it is clear to archaeologists that the cave built under the Pyramid of the Sun was not built accidentally. In fact, the cave itself holds astronomical importance in relation to the Aztec people and their religion. The cave was a symbol of creation, of life itself; a theme throughout the religious history of Mesoamerica. Caves themselves became a crucial aspect of Mesoamerican mythology as it was believed that different ethnic groups sprang from caves and cavities. Thus, caves were considered to be the “wombs of the Earth.” Moreover, a large number of glyphs using the symbol for caves have been discovered by archaeologists indicating their importance. Several gods and deities are associated with caves such as Tepeyolotl, an Earth deity, and the God of fire, Xiuhtecuhtli, who was believed to call a cave at the center of the Earth his abode. This would help explain why caves became a site for religious practices and offerings. For example, in the Etzalcualiztli fiesta, a calendar celebrating the religious offering representing Tlaloc, the god of rain, was sacrificed and then placed in a cave. 

The Pyramid of the Sun, built on top of the holy cave described in the excavation above, became a focal point for society as it was located on the Street of the Dead. More importantly than its physical location, the city layout of Teotihuacan incorporated alignments dictated by the astronomically significant orientation of the Pyramid of the Sun. The peak of the pyramid was constructed to align with the horizon in order to serve as a natural marker of the sun’s position on the Aztec quarter days of the year. Thus, this cave is more important than most in Aztec culture and religion. This cave has been determined to have been built early in Teotihuacan’s history as a shrine that was later covered with the Pyramid of the Sun. The site of this shrine served as a ceremonial place for the Aztec people as it held significant religious history for the city of Teotihuacan.

Recovered artifacts

Only a few caches of artifacts have been found in and around the pyramid.  Obsidian arrowheads and human figurines have been discovered inside the pyramid and similar objects have been found at the nearby Pyramid of the Moon and Pyramid of the Feathered Serpent in the Ciudadela.  These objects may have represented sacrificial victims. A unique historical artifact discovered near the foot of the pyramid at the end of the nineteenth century was the Teotihuacan Ocelot, which is now in the British Museum's collection.  In addition, burial sites of children have been found in excavations at the corners of the pyramid. It is believed that these burials were part of a sacrificial ritual dedicating the building of the pyramid.

See also
List of Mesoamerican pyramids
List of tallest structures built before the 20th century

References

Further reading

Leibsohn, Dana, and Barbara E. Mundy, “Making Sense of the Pre-Columbian,” Vistas: Visual Culture in Spanish America, 1520–1820 (2015). http://www.fordham.edu/vistas

Buildings and structures completed in the 2nd century
Teotihuacan
Archaeological sites in Mexico
Pyramids in Mexico